Panax pseudoginseng is a species of the genus Panax. Common names include Pseudoginseng, Nepal ginseng and Himalayan ginseng. Pseudoginseng belongs to the same scientific genus as ginseng. In Latin, the word panax means "cure-all", and the family of ginseng plants is one of the best-known herbs.

See also
 Panax notoginseng

References

pseudoginseng
Plants used in traditional Chinese medicine